In Orbit  may refer to:

 In Orbit (September album)
 In Orbit (Clark Terry album)
 In Orbit, an album by The Stomachmouths
 In Orbit, an album by Sun Araw
 In Orbit, 1967 novel by Wright Morris

See also 
 Orbit (disambiguation)